Hino, Tokyo held a mayoral election on April 17, 2005. Incumbent mayor Baba Hiromichi won the election.

Candidates 

 Baba Hiromichi, incumbent Independent mayor supported by the Liberal Democratic Party, Democratic Party of Japan, New Komeito Party and the Social Democratic Party.
 Kubota Hiromichi, Independent candidate supported by the Japanese Communist Party. Works as a lawyer.

Results

References 
 Results from JanJan 
 Japan Press Coverage

Hino, Tokyo
2005 elections in Japan
Mayoral elections in Japan
April 2005 events in Japan
2005 in Tokyo